Caney Hollow is an unincorporated community in Hardin County, Tennessee, United States. Caney Hollow is located on the west bank of Pickwick Lake just north of the Mississippi and Alabama borders.

References

Unincorporated communities in Hardin County, Tennessee
Unincorporated communities in Tennessee